Disney+ Hotstar (also known as Hotstar) is an Indian brand of subscription video on-demand over-the-top streaming service owned by Novi Digital Entertainment of Disney Star and operated by Disney Media and Entertainment Distribution, both divisions of The Walt Disney Company. Initially, the platform launched as Hotstar in February 2015 by Star India.

Indian original films

Disney+ Hotstar Multiplex 
Also dubbed as Hotstar Premiere Nights where the service operated only as Hotstar. The below titles are exclusively streaming on the platform forgoing their theatrical releases.

Hotstar Specials 
Hotstar Specials is a brand of Disney+ Hotstar on which the platform releases their original films done exclusively for the service.

Documentary

Others

Southeast Asian original films
Disney+ Hotstar also carries Southeast Asian original films that commissioned exclusively in their respective regions. The following Indonesian and Malaysian films were premiered direct-to-streaming under the Hotstar Originals banner due to COVID-19-related cinema closures. New local films premiered every Friday in Indonesia, with the exclusion of Sabar Ini Ujian (Sabar, It's a Test) as Indonesian launch title, along with TV series premiered at the same day, in absence of latest Indonesian films release, such as Si Juki Anak Kosan. Disney+ Hotstar was originally teased with 7 new Indonesian films, but was later expanded to more than 13 local films. Malaysian release will also get their local films premiered as well. Some Indonesian and Malaysian films will be available to stream elsewhere (including global streaming platform such as Netflix, Amazon Prime Video, Apple TV+, Catchplay+, Viu, WeTV/iflix and iQIYI; along with regional streaming platform such as Vision+, Vidio, Mola and KlikFilm) after their first-run releases.

Indonesian original films

Malaysian original films

Disney+ Originals 

These are commissioned by Disney+ and are exclusively available on Disney+ Hotstar in India and selected Southeast Asian countries as Disney+ is fully integrated with the service.

Exclusive distributions

Exclusive international distribution 
The following titles are the general films that distributed by Disney subsidiaries (known as Walt Disney Studios), including film releases from Hulu, Star, Star+, Walt Disney Pictures, 20th Century Studios, 20th Century Animation and Searchlight Pictures for streaming exclusively on the platform. Films labelled with a † symbol signifies a film that exclusively released on the platform forgoing theatrical and/or Disney+ Premier Access releases.

Documentaries

Non-English language

Japanese

Turkish

Exclusive third-party distribution 
These titles are being bought by Disney due to distribution rights for streaming exclusively on the platform.

Upcoming exclusive distributions

Exclusive international distribution

Exclusive third-party distribution

Notes

References 

 
Original films distributed by Hotstar